Stamsø or Stamsøy is a village in Risør municipality in Agder county, Norway.

Stamsø is also a family name for a number of people in the region. The Stamsø family name has roots that can be traced several centuries back in time. There was once a school at Stamsø, but it is no longer in use.

References

Villages in Agder
Risør